Estadio Municipal de Vecindario is a multi-use stadium in Santa Lucía de Tirajana, Spain.  It is currently used mostly for football matches and is the home ground of UD Vecindario.  The stadium holds 4,500 people. The pitch size is 101x64m.

In 2006, with the promotion of Vecindario to Segunda División, the stadium became the first one with artificial turf in the Spanish professional football.

External links
Estadios de España 

Football venues in the Canary Islands
UD Vecindario
Buildings and structures in Gran Canaria